Abrotelia ( 5th century BC) was a female Pythagorean philosopher. She was one of seventeen women included in Life of Pythagoras (De Vita Pythagorica), written by Iamblichus. Abrotelia's father was Abroteles of Tarentum and she is thought to have been born in Tarentum. Iamblichus cited Abrotelia as one of the illustrious female Pythagorean philosophers, although her name was among the nine who were listed with names of their husbands or male family members. Some scholars such as Ethel Kersey identified Abrotelia as one of those who wrote or taught in traditional philosophical fields such as metaphysics, logic, and aesthetics, among others. She is also listed in Gilles Ménage's Historia Mulierum Philosopharum, which showed the Pythagorean school as the sect with the most number of female philosophers, with its adherents greater than the Platonic sect.

References

Further reading

Pythagoreans
5th-century BC philosophers
5th-century BC Greek women
Ancient Greek women philosophers